Chilomonas is a genus of cryptophytes, including the species Chilomonas paramecium. Chilomonas is a protozoa (heterotroph). Chilomonas is golden brown and has two flagella.

References

Cryptomonad genera